Zacualpan may refer to any of the following Mexican cities:

Zacualpan, Colima
Zacualpan, Guerrero
Zacualpan, State of Mexico
Zacualpan de Amilpas, Morelos
Zacualpan, Nayarit
San Jerónimo Zacualpan (municipality), Tlaxcala
Zacualpan, Veracruz

Similar names
Zacualtipan, Hidalgo